Walt Disney's Treasury of Classic Tales is an American Disney comic strip, which ran on Sundays in newspapers from July 13, 1952, until February 15, 1987. It was distributed by King Features Syndicate. Each story adapted a different Disney film, such as Darby O'Gill and the Little People, Peter Pan, or Davy Crockett. It was run in relatively few papers, with 58 in 1957 and 55 in 1966, and was principally a vehicle for promoting new and re-released Disney films.

Publication history

From March 8 to June 18, 1950, Disney distributed a limited-time Sunday strip adaptations of their new animated feature Cinderella, written by Frank Reilly, with art by Manuel Gonzales and Dick Moores. The same team followed the next year with Alice in Wonderland, which ran from September 2 to December 16, 1951. Judged a success, the experiment was turned into an ongoing feature in 1952, beginning with The Story of Robin Hood.

The strip featured a wide variety of Disney stories. The animated features adapted for the strip include Peter Pan (1953), Lady and the Tramp (1955), Sleeping Beauty (1958), The Sword in the Stone (1963) and The Jungle Book (1968). Classic Tales also featured animated shorts, including Lambert the Sheepish Lion (1956) and Ben and Me (1953), and featurettes like Peter & The Wolf (1954) and Winnie the Pooh and the Honey Tree (1966).

Treasury of Classic Tales also adapted live-action films like Old Yeller (1957–58), Swiss Family Robinson (1960), Mary Poppins (1964) and The Love Bug (1969). The strip transitioned from historical dramas like The Sword and the Rose (1953) and Kidnapped (1960) to comedies like The Shaggy Dog (1959) and The Parent Trap (1961).

The 1979–80 adaptation of The Black Hole was particularly notable for featuring pencil art by comics icon Jack Kirby, with Mike Royer inking.

Some of the stories created toward the end of the strip's run in the 1980s were original stories featuring characters from different Disney animated movies, including The Return of the Rescuers (1983), Dumbo, the Substitute Stork (1984) and Cinderella: Bibbidi-Bobbodi-Who? (1984).

Most stories ran for thirteen weeks. A total of 129 stories were created between 1952 and 1987.

List of story titles
{| class="wikitable" margin:auto;"
|-
! Title
!Year
! Dates
! Writing
! Art
! INDUCKSlink
|-
| The Story of Robin Hood
|1952
| July 13 – Dec 28
| rowspan="84" | Frank Reilly
| Jesse Marsh
| ToCT 1
|-
| Peter Pan
| rowspan="3" |1953
| Jan 4 – June 14
| Manuel Gonzales& Dick Moores
| ToCT 2
|-
| The Sword and the Rose
| June 21 – Oct 25
| Jesse Marsh
| ToCT 3
|-
| Ben and Me
| Nov 1 – Dec 27
| Manuel Gonzales& Dick Moores
| ToCT 4
|-
| Rob Roy
| rowspan="3" |1954
| Jan 3 – May 30
| Jesse Marsh
| ToCT 5
|-
| Peter & The Wolf
| June 6 – July 25
| Manuel Gonzales& Dick Moores
| ToCT 6
|-
| 20,000 Leagues Under the Sea
| Aug 1 – Dec 26
| Jesse Marsh
| ToCT 7
|-
| Lady and the Tramp
|1955
| Jan 2 – July 10
| Manuel Gonzales& Dick Moores
| ToCT 8
|-
| The Legends of Davy Crockett
| rowspan="4" |1956
| July 7, 1955 – Jan 8
| rowspan="3" | Jesse Marsh
| ToCT 9
|-
| The Littlest Outlaw
| Jan 15 – March 26
| ToCT 10
|-
| The Great Locomotive Chase
| April 2 – July 29
| ToCT 11
|-
| Lambert the Sheepish Lion
| Aug 5 – Sep 30
| Floyd Gottfredson
| ToCT 12
|-
| Westward Ho, the Wagons!'
|1956–1957
| Oct 7 – Jan 27
| Jesse Marsh
| ToCT 13
|-
| Gus & Jaq| rowspan="3" |1957
| Feb 3 – March 31
| Ken Hultgren
| ToCT 14
|-
| Johnny Tremain| Apr 7 – June 30
| rowspan="3" | Jesse Marsh
| ToCT 15
|-
| Perri| July 7 – Nov 24
| ToCT 16
|-
| Old Yeller|1957–1958
| Dec 1 – Feb 23
| ToCT 17
|-
| The Seven Dwarfs & The Witch Queen| rowspan="3" |1958
| March 2 – Apr 27
| Julius Svedsen
| ToCT 18
|-
| The Light in the Forest| May 4 – July 27
| Jesse Marsh
| ToCT 19
|-
| Sleeping Beauty| Aug 3 – Dec 28
| Julius Svedsen
| ToCT 20
|-
| The Shaggy Dog| rowspan="3" |1959
| Jan 4 – Apr 26
| rowspan="7" | Jesse Marsh
| ToCT 21
|-
| Darby O'Gill and the Little People| May 3 – Aug 3
| ToCT 22
|-
| Third Man on the Mountain| Sept 6 – Dec 27
| ToCT 23
|-
| Toby Tyler| rowspan="4" |1960
| Jan 3 – Mar 27
| ToCT 24
|-
| Kidnapped| Apr 3 – June 26
| ToCT 25
|-
| Pollyanna| July 3 – Sep 25
| ToCT 26
|-
| Swiss Family Robinson| Oct 2 – Dec 25
| ToCT 27
|-
| 101 Dalmatians| rowspan="4" |1961
| Jan 1 – Mar 26 
| Bill Wright & Chuck Fuson,
Manuel Gonzales & Floyd Gottfredson
| ToCT 28
|-
| Nikki, Wild Dog of the North| Apr 2 – June 25
| rowspan="2" | Jesse Marsh
| ToCT 29
|-
| The Parent Trap| July 2 – Sep 25
| ToCT 30
|-
| Babes in Toyland| Oct 1 – Dec 31
| Joseph Hale
| ToCT 31
|-
| Moon Pilot| rowspan="4" |1962
| Jan 7 – Mar 25
| Jesse Marsh
| ToCT 32
|-
| Bon Voyage!| Apr 1 – June 24
| John Ushler
| ToCT 33
|-
| Big Red 
| July 1 – Sep 30
| Jesse Marsh
| ToCT 34
|-
| In Search of the Castaways 
| Oct 7 – Dec 30
| rowspan="42" | John Ushler
| ToCT 35
|-
| Son of Flubber| rowspan="4" |1963
| Jan 6 – Mar 31
| ToCT 36
|-
| Miracle of the White Stallions| Apr 7 – June 30
| ToCT 37
|-
| Savage Sam| July 7 – Sep 29
| ToCT 38
|-
| The Sword in the Stone| Oct 6 – Dec 29
| ToCT 39
|-
| A Tiger Walks| rowspan="4" |1964
| Jan 5 – March 29
| ToCT 40
|-
| The Three Lives of Thomasina| Apr 6 – June 28
| ToCT 41
|-
| The Moon-Spinners 
| July 5 – Sep 27
| ToCT 42
|-
| Mary Poppins| Oct 4 – Dec 27
| ToCT 43
|-
| Those Calloways| rowspan="4" |1965
| Jan 3 – Mar 28
| ToCT 44
|-
| The Monkey's Uncle| Apr 4 – June 27
| ToCT 45
|-
| Dumbo| July 4 – Sep 26
| ToCT 46
|-
| That Darn Cat!| Oct 3 – Dec 26
| ToCT 47
|-
| Winnie the Pooh and the Honey Tree| rowspan="4" |1966
| Jan 2 – Mar 27
| ToCT 48
|-
| Lt. Robin Crusoe, U.S.N. 
| Apr 3 – June 26
| ToCT 49
|-
| The Fighting Prince of Donegal| July 3 – Sep 25
| ToCT 50
|-
| Follow Me, Boys!| Oct 2 – Nov 27
| ToCT 51
|-
| Monkeys, Go Home!|1966–1967
| Dec 4 – Jan 29
| ToCT 52
|-
| The Adventures of Bullwhip Griffin| rowspan="3" |1967
| Feb 5 – Apr 30
| ToCT 53
|-
| The Gnome-Mobile| May 7 – July 30
| ToCT 54
|-
| The Happiest Millionaire 
| Aug 6 – Oct 29
| ToCT 55
|-
| The Jungle Book|1967–1968
| Nov 5 – Jan 28
| ToCT 56
|-
| Blackbeard's Ghost| rowspan="4" |1968
| Feb 4 – Apr 28
| ToCT 57
|-
| Never A Dull Moment| May 6 – July 28
| ToCT 58
|-
| Winnie the Pooh and the Blustery Day| Aug 4 – Sep 29
| ToCT 59
|-
| The Horse in the Gray Flannel Suit| Oct 6 – Dec 29
| ToCT 60
|-
| Smith!| rowspan="4" |1969
| Jan 5 – Feb 23
| ToCT 61
|-
| The Love Bug| Mar 2 – May 25
| ToCT 62
|-
| Hang Your Hat on the Wind!| June 1 – Aug 31
| ToCT 63
|-
| My Dog, The Thief| Sept 7 – Nov 30
| ToCT 64
|-
| The Computer Wore Tennis Shoes|1969–1970
| Dec 7 – Feb 22
| ToCT 65
|-
| King of the Grizzlies| rowspan="3" |1970
| Mar 1 – May 31
| ToCT 66
|-
| The Boatniks| June 7 – Aug 30
| ToCT 67
|-
| The Aristocats| Sept 6 – Dec 27
| ToCT 68
|-
| The Barefoot Executive| rowspan="4" |1971
| Jan 3 – Mar 28
| ToCT 69
|-
| The Million Dollar Duck| Apr 4 – June 27
| ToCT 70
|-
| Bedknobs and Broomsticks| July 4 – Oct 31
| ToCT 71
|-
| The Living Desert| Nov 7 – Dec 26
| ToCT 72
|-
| Napoleon and Samantha| rowspan="4" |1972
| Jan 2 – Mar 26
| ToCT 73
|-
| Now You See Him, Now You Don't| Apr 2 – June 25
| ToCT 74
|-
| The Legend of Lobo| July 2 – Sep 24
| ToCT 75
|-
| Snowball Express 
| Oct 1 – Dec 31
| ToCT 76
|-
| The World's Greatest Athlete| rowspan="3" |1973
| Jan 7 – Mar 26
| rowspan="15" | Mike Arens
| ToCT 77
|-
| Cinderella| Apr 1 – June 24
| ToCT 78
|-
| One Little Indian| July 1 – Sep 30
| ToCT 79
|-
| Robin Hood|1973–1974
| Oct 7 – Jan 27
| ToCT 80
|-
| Alice in Wonderland| rowspan="3" |1974
| Feb 3 – Apr 28
| ToCT 81
|-
| Herbie Rides Again| May 5 – July 28
| ToCT 82
|-
| The Bears and I| Aug 4 – Sep 29
| ToCT 83
|-
| The Island at the Top of the World|1974–1975
| October 6, 1974 – January 26, 1975
| ToCT 84
|-
| Escape to Witch Mountain 
| rowspan="4" |1975
| Feb 3 – Apr 27
| Carl Fallberg
| ToCT 85
|-
| The Apple Dumpling Gang| May 4 – June 29
| rowspan="3" | Frank Reilly
| ToCT 86
|-
| One of Our Dinosaurs Is Missing| July 6 – Sep 28
| ToCT 87
|-
| Winnie the Pooh and Tigger Too 
| Oct 5 – Nov 30
| ToCT 88
|-
| No Deposit, No Return|1975–1976
| December 7, 1975 – February 29, 1976
| Frank Reilly & Carl Fallberg
| ToCT 89
|-
| Gus| rowspan="3" |1976
| Mar 7 – May 30
| rowspan="3" | Carl Fallberg
| ToCT 90
|-
| Treasure of Matecumbe| June 6 – Aug 29
| ToCT 91
|-
| The Shaggy D.A.| Sept 5 – Nov 28
| rowspan="12" | Richard Moore
| ToCT 92
|-
| Freaky Friday|1976–1977
| Dec 5 – Feb 27
| Al Stoffel
| ToCT 93
|-
| The Rescuers| rowspan="3" |1977
| Mar 6 – May 29
| Carl Fallberg
| ToCT 94
|-
| Herbie Goes to Monte Carlo| June 5 – Aug 28
| Al Stoffel
| ToCT 95
|-
| Pete's Dragon| Sept 4 – Nov 27
| Carl Fallberg
| ToCT 96
|-
| Candleshoe|1977–1978
| December 4, 1977 – Feb 26
| Carl Fallberg & Al Stoffel
| ToCT 97
|-
| The Cat from Outer Space| rowspan="3" |1978
| Mar 5 – May 28
| Carl Fallberg
| ToCT 98
|-
| Hot Lead and Cold Feet| June 4 – Aug 27
| Al Stoffel
| ToCT 99
|-
| Pinocchio| Sept 3 – Nov 26
| rowspan="2" | Carl Fallberg
| ToCT 100
|-
| The North Avenue Irregulars|1978–1979
| Dec 3 – Feb 25
| ToCT 101
|-
| The Apple Dumpling Gang Rides Again| rowspan="2" |1979
| Mar 4 – May 27
| rowspan="2" | Al Stoffel
| ToCT 102
|-
| Unidentified Flying Oddball| June 3 – Aug 26
| ToCT 103
|-
| The Black Hole|1979–1980
| Sept 2 – Feb 24
| rowspan="2" | Carl Fallberg
| Jack Kirby & Mike Royer
| ToCT 104
|-
| The Watcher in the Woods| rowspan="3" |1980
| Mar 2 – May 25
| rowspan="3" | Richard Moore
| ToCT 105
|-
| The Last Flight of Noah's Ark| June 1 – Aug 24
| rowspan="2" | Al Stoffel
| ToCT 106
|-
| The Devil and Max Devlin| Aug 31 – Nov 23
| ToCT 107
|-
| Condorman|1980–1981
| Nov 30 – Apr 12
| Greg Crosby
| Russ Heath
| ToCT 108
|-
| The Fox and the Hound|1981
| Apr 19 – Aug 30
| rowspan="4" | Jeannette Steiner
| rowspan="4" | Richard Moore
| ToCT 109
|-
| Night Crossing|1981–1982
| Sept 6 – Jan 17
| ToCT 110
|-
| Tron|1982
| Jan 24 – June 6
| ToCT 111
|-
| Tex| rowspan="2" |1982
| June 13 – Sep 26
| ToCT 112
|-
| Mickey's Christmas Carol| Oct 3 – Dec 26
| rowspan="3" | Carl Fallberg
| Richard Moore & Frank Johnson
| ToCT 113
|-
| Ferdinand the Bull & The Robbers| rowspan="4" |1983
| Jan 2 – Mar 6
| rowspan="16" | Richard Moore
| ToCT 114
|-
| Snow White and the Seven Dwarfs| Mar 13 – June 26
| ToCT 115
|-
| The Adventures of Mr. Toad| July 3 – Sep 25
| rowspan="5" | Tom Yakutis
| ToCT 116
|-
| The Return of the Rescuers| Oct 2 – Dec 25
| ToCT 117
|-
| Dumbo, the Substitute Stork| rowspan="4" |1984
| Jan 1 – Mar 25
| ToCT 118
|-
| Robin Hood in: Rich John, Poor John| Apr 1 – June 24
| ToCT 119
|-
| Cinderella: Bibbidi-Bobbodi-Who?| July 1 – Sep 23
| ToCT 120
|-
| Pinocchio & Jiminy Cricket: A Coat Tale| Sept 30 – Dec 30
| Carl Fallberg
| ToCT 121
|-
| Black Arrow| rowspan="3" |1985
| Jan 6 – Mar 31
| Tom Yakutis
| ToCT 122
|-
| Return to Oz| Apr 7 – July 14
| Carl Fallberg
| ToCT 123
|-
| The Black Cauldron| July 21 – Oct 27
| Tom Yakutis
| ToCT 124
|-
| The Journey of Natty Gann|1985–1986
| Nov 3 – Jan 26
| Don Dougherty
| ToCT 125
|-
| The Search For Sleeping Beauty| rowspan="3" |1986
| Feb 2 – Apr 27
| rowspan="4" | Carl Fallberg
| ToCT 126
|-
| The Great Mouse Detective| May 4 – July 27
| ToCT 127
|-
| Song of the South| Aug 3 – Nov 16
| ToCT 128
|-
| Tramp's Cat-astrophe|1986–1987
| Nov 23 – Feb 15
| ToCT 129
|-
|}

Reprintings

In 2016, IDW Publishing and their imprint The Library of American Comics (LoAC) began to collect all the Treasury of Classic Tales stories in a definitive hardcover reprint series. As of 2019, three volumes have been published, reprinting all the stories from Robin Hood (1952) through In Search of the Castaways'' (1962). In April 2018, it was announced that, due to the sales goal of the series not being met, the third volume may be the last one to be published.

Notes and references

External links
 Walt Disney's Treasury of Classic Tales (samples of 1970s strips)
 INDUCKS database of credits for Treasury of Classic Tales

American comic strips
1952 comics debuts
1987 comics endings
Disney comic strips
Comics based on novels
Comics based on films
Comics based on fairy tales